Rankin Building may refer to:

in the United States (by state)
Rankin Building (Santa Ana, California), listed on the National Register of Historic Places in Orange County, California
Rankin Block, Rockland, Maine, listed on the National Register of Historic Places in Knox County, Maine
Rankin Building (Columbus, Ohio), listed on the National Register of Historic Places in Columbus, Ohio